The year 1977 in architecture involved some significant architectural events and new buildings.

Buildings and structures

Buildings

 January 1 – The Hilton Budapest hotel, designed by Béla Pintér, is opened.
 January 31 – The Centre Georges Pompidou in Paris, designed by Renzo Piano, Richard Rogers and Gianfranco Franchini, is opened.
 February 28 – The 'Beehive', New Zealand Parliament Buildings, Wellington, designed by government architect Fergus Sheppard and W. M. Angus to a concept by Basil Spence, first stage officially opened.
 March – Renaissance Center in Detroit, Michigan, designed by John C. Portman Jr., is inaugurated.
 April 19 – Yale Center for British Art gallery, designed by Louis Kahn (died 1974), opens to the public in New Haven, Connecticut, United States.
 Sainsbury Centre at the University of East Anglia in Norwich, England, designed by Norman Foster.
 Tehran Museum of Contemporary Art in Iran, designed by Kamran Diba, is inaugurated.
 Extension to Slovak National Gallery in Bratislava, designed by Vladimír Dedeček, is completed.
 30 Cannon Street in the City of London, England, designed by engineers Whinney, Son & Austen Hall with Ove Arup & Partners, is completed for Crédit Lyonnais.
 The Citigroup Center at 601 Lexington Avenue in Manhattan, New York City, is completed; its structural engineer William LeMessurier subsequently discovers it is vulnerable to extreme wind conditions and clandestine retrospective strengthening is carried out.
 The Fernmeldeturm Nürnberg in Nürnberg, Germany is completed.
 The MLC Centre in Sydney, Australia is completed and opened.
 The Torre Espacial in Buenos Aires, Argentina is completed.
 The Silberturm in Frankfurt am Main, Germany is completed.
 The Shell Centre (Calgary) in Calgary, Alberta
 The Dome Tower, Calgary and Home Oil Tower, Calgary in Calgary
 The Harbour Centre in Vancouver, British Columbia, Canada is completed.
 The Renaissance Center in Detroit, Michigan is completed.
 Penton Street flats in Islington, London, designed by John Melvin.
 Cube houses in the Netherlands, designed by Piet Blom, built in Helmond and designed for Rotterdam.
 The rose window of Lancing College Chapel in England, designed by Stephen Dykes Bower, is completed.

Awards
 AIA Gold Medal – Richard Neutra (posthumous)
 Architecture Firm Award – Sert Jackson and Associates
 Grand prix national de l'architecture – Paul Andreu; Roland Simounet
 RAIA Gold Medal – Ronald Gilling
 RIBA Royal Gold Medal – Denys Lasdun
 Twenty-five Year Award – Christ Lutheran Church

Publications
 A Pattern Language by Christopher Alexander, Sara Ishikawa and Murray Silverstein.
 The Language of Postmodern Architecture by Charles Jencks.

Births
 December 21 – Michel Abboud, Lebanese-born architect

Deaths
 March 5 – Herman Munthe-Kaas, Norwegian functionalist architect (born 1890)
 August 25 – Károly Kós, Hungarian architect, writer, illustrator, ethnologist and politician (born 1883)
 December 23 – Raymond McGrath, Australian-born architect, illustrator and interior designer working in Ireland (born 1903)
 Genia Averbuch, Israeli architect (born 1909)

References

 
20th-century architecture